Theodor is a masculine given name. It is a German form of Theodore. It is also a variant of Teodor.

List of people with the given name Theodor
 Theodor Adorno, (1903–1969), German philosopher
 Theodor Aman, Romanian painter
 Theodor Blueger, Latvian professional ice hockey forward for the Pittsburgh Penguins of the National Hockey League (NHL)
 Theodor Burghele, Romanian surgeon, President of the Romanian Academy
 Theodor Busse, German general during World War I and World War II
 Theodor Cazaban, Romanian writer
 Theodor Eicke, German SS general
 Theodor Fischer (fencer), German Olympic épée and foil fencer 
 Theodor Fontane, (1819–1898), German writer
 Theodor Geisel, American writer and cartoonist, known by the pseudonym Dr. Seuss
 Theodor W. Hänsch (born 1940), German physicist
 Theodor Herzl, (1860–1904), Austrian-Hungary Jewish journalist and the founder of modern political Zionism
 Theodor Heuss, (1884–1963), German politician and publicist
 Theodor Innitzer, Austrian Catholic cardinal
 Theodor Kittelsen (1857–1914), Norwegian painter and illustrator
 Theodor "Teddy" Kollek (1911–2007), mayor of Jerusalem from 1965 to 1993
 Emil Theodor Kocher, Swiss medical researcher, recipient of the Nobel Prize in Physiology or Medicine
 Theodor Mommsen, (1817–1903), German writer and historian, Nobel Prize in Literature 1902 laureate
 Theodor Paleologu, Romanian politician
 Theodor Pallady, Romanian painter
 Theodor Rosetti, Romanian politician
 Theodor S. Slen (1885-1986), American judge, lawyer, and politician
 Theodor Stolojan, Romanian politician
 Theodor Svedberg, Swedish chemist, Nobel Prize in Chemistry laureate
 Theodor Șerbănescu, Romanian poet
 Theodor Zwinger, Swiss scholar

See also
 Theodore (name)
 Teodor

Danish masculine given names
Dutch masculine given names
German masculine given names
Icelandic masculine given names
Norwegian masculine given names
Romanian masculine given names
Swedish masculine given names